John Gilstrap (1957) is an American novelist and a New York Times Bestselling author of over twenty thrillers, including the Jonathan Grave thriller series, which first appeared in 2009. His prior works include five stand-alone novels and one nonfiction thriller about the Delta Force rescue of Kurt Muse.

Biography
Gilstrap was raised in Northern Virginia, where he attended public school in Fairfax County Public Schools, graduating from Robinson Secondary School in 1975. Gilstrap lives in Fairfax, Virginia and has a YouTube channel where he gives writing advice and insight on the publishing industry.

Beginning in 2021, Gilstrap is launching a new series of thrillers, beginning with Crimson Phoenix. This new series features Victoria Emerson, a former member of the U.S. House of Representatives who finds herself an unwilling leader of desperate people during the aftermath of a nuclear war.

Books

Jonathan Grave thrillers
No Mercy (2009)
Hostage Zero (2010)
Threat Warning (2011)
Damage Control (2011)
High Treason (2013)
Soft Targets (2013)
End Game (2014)
Against All Enemies (2015)
Friendly Fire (2016)
Final Target (2017)
Scorpion Strike (2018)
Total Mayhem (2019)
Hellfire (2020)
Stealth Attack (2021)

Nonfiction thrillers
Six Minutes To Freedom (with Kurt Muse) – 2006

Standalone thrillers
Nathan's Run (1996)
At All Costs (1998)
Even Steven (2000)
Scott Free (2002)
Nick of Time (2016)

Victoria Emerson thrillers
Crimson Phoenix (2021)

Screenplays
Word of Honor adapted from the novel by Nelson DeMille
Young Men and Fire adapted from the book by Norman McLean
Red Dragon (uncredited) adapted from the novel by Thomas Harris
Nathan's Run adapted from the novel by John Gilstrap

References

1957 births
20th-century American novelists
21st-century American novelists
20th-century American male writers
21st-century American male writers
21st-century American screenwriters
American male novelists
American male screenwriters
American thriller writers
College of William & Mary alumni
Living people
Novelists from Virginia
People from Fairfax, Virginia
University of Southern California alumni